Chancel Ndaye (born 14 April 1999) is a Burundian footballer who currently plays as a defender.

Career
He grew up in the youth sector of the LLB Académic, in February 2019 he moved to Europe signing with the Czechs of Vyškov.

On 20 December 2019 of the same year he made a permanent move to the Las Vegas Lights.

He represented the national under-20 team at the 2019 Africa U-20 Cup of Nations.

References

External links

1999 births
Living people
Las Vegas Lights FC players
Burundian footballers
Burundian expatriate footballers
Association football defenders
USL Championship players
Burundi international footballers
People from Bujumbura
Burundian expatriate sportspeople in the United States
Expatriate soccer players in the United States
Burundi under-20 international footballers